The following is a summary of Down county football team's 2020 season, which was its 117th year. The season was suspended in March 2020 due to the COVID-19 pandemic. The season resumed in mid-October of the same year.

Kits

Competitions

Dr McKenna Cup

The draw for the 2020 Dr McKenna Cup was made on 4 December 2019.

Fixtures

Table

Reports

National Football League Division 3

Down competed in Division Three for the 2020 National League season. Fixtures were published by the GAA on 26 November 2019.

On 12 March 2020, the GAA suspended the National League in mid-March due to the impact of the COVID-19 pandemic on Gaelic games. Games resumed in October 2020.

Fixtures

Table

Reports

Ulster Senior Football Championship

The draw for the 2020 Ulster Senior Football Championship took place on 9 October 2019. On 26 November 2019, it was confirmed that Down would face Fermanagh on 24 May 2020. This date was then changed to 8 November due to the COVID-19 pandemic.

Fixtures

Bracket

Reports

All-Ireland Senior Football Championship

Due to the impact of the COVID-19 pandemic on Gaelic games, the GAA announced that there would be no back-door route into the All-Ireland Championship. Therefore, because Down did not win the Ulster Championship, they did not qualify for the 2020 All-Ireland Championship.

References

Down
Gaelic
Down county football team seasons